The Frances Canyon Ruin is a Navajo pueblito near Blanco in Rio Arriba County, New Mexico, United States.  Built ca. 1716, it reflects economic and social changes taking place among the Navajo of this area during the 18th century.  In the previous century the Spanish introduced sheep, fruit, cattle, and horses into the area. This, along with the Navajo's adaptation of certain pueblo lifeways after the Pueblo Revolt (1680-1692), led to increased settlement size and new trade relations. This site can be contrasted with modern Navajo communities which consist of clusters of hogans, widely dispersed with a trade system based on scattered trading posts and the motor vehicle.

It is one of the Navajo pueblitos.

See also

National Register of Historic Places listings in Rio Arriba County, New Mexico

References

External links

Archaeological sites on the National Register of Historic Places in New Mexico
Buildings and structures in Rio Arriba County, New Mexico
Bureau of Land Management areas in New Mexico
Navajo history
National Register of Historic Places in Rio Arriba County, New Mexico